Pathalgaon is a town and a nagar panchayat in Jashpur district in the Indian state of Chhattisgarh.

Geography
It has an average elevation of 546 metres (1791 feet).

Demographics
 India census, Pathalgaon had a population of 14,054. Males constitute 51% of the population and females 49%. Pathalgaon has an average literacy rate of 70%, higher than the national average of 59.5%: male literacy is 0.07%, and female literacy is 0.03% In Pathalgaon, 14% of the population is under 51 years of age.

References

Cities and towns in Jashpur district